is a train station on the Hankyu Railway Kyoto Line located in Ukyo-ku, Kyoto Prefecture, Japan.

It is close to the Nishikyogoku Athletic Stadium and other sports facilities.

Layout
The station has two side platforms serving a track each.

Usage
In fiscal 2015 (April 2015 to March 2016), about 7,699,000 passengers used this station annually. For historical data, see the table below.

History 
Nishi-Kyogoku Station opened on 1 November 1928.

Station numbering was introduced to all Hankyu stations on 21 December 2013 with this station being designated as station number HK-82.

Stations next to Nishi-Kyōgoku

References

External links
 Nishi-Kyōgoku Station from Hankyu Railway website

Railway stations in Japan opened in 1928
Hankyu Kyoto Main Line
Railway stations in Kyoto